Whitemouth Falls Provincial Park is a provincial park located where the Whitemouth River joins the Winnipeg River in Manitoba, Canada. It was designated as a Provincial Park in 1974.

Significant archaeological assets are found within the park including three burial grounds.

The Seven Sisters Generating Station built in 1931 on the Winnipeg River can be easily seen from the park.

Angling is a popular park activity with catch including walleye, lake whitefish and northern pike. Other fish present in the park waters include sauger, rock bass, yellow perch, catfish and mooneye.

This removed some areas thought to be of lower ecological value while adding protection to habitat used by great gray owls.

The park is located in the Pinawa ecodistrict within the Lake of the Woods ecoregion. This ecoregion is part of the Boreal Shield ecozone.

See also
List of protected areas of Manitoba

References

External links

 Whitemouth Falls Provincial Park Draft Management Plan
 Whitemouth Falls Provincial Park on iNaturalist
 Whitemouth Falls Provincial Park, E-bird Hotspot

Provincial parks of Manitoba
Protected areas of Manitoba